Prairie Trails is a lost 1920 American silent comedy Western film directed by George Marshall and starring Tom Mix.

Cast
 Tom Mix as Tex Benton
 Charles K. French as Stephen McWhorter
 Kathleen O'Connor as Janet McWhorter
 Robert Walker as Winthrop Adams Endicott
 Gloria Hope as Alice Endicott
 Sid Jordan as Jack Purdy
 Harry Dunkinson as Ike Stork
 William Elmer as Rod Blake

References

External links

 
 

1920 films
Lost Western (genre) comedy films
1920s Western (genre) comedy films
Films directed by George Marshall
Fox Film films
Lost American films
1920 lost films
1920 comedy films
Silent American Western (genre) comedy films
1920s American films
1920s English-language films